A partial solar eclipse will occur on Wednesday, September 2, 2054. A solar eclipse occurs when the Moon passes between Earth and the Sun, thereby totally or partly obscuring the image of the Sun for a viewer on Earth. A partial solar eclipse occurs in the polar regions of the Earth when the center of the Moon's shadow misses the Earth.

This is the last of first set of partial eclipses of Solar Saros 155. The next event is the Total Solar Eclipse on September 12, 2072, which is the first of 56 umbral eclipses, starting in 2072 and ending in 3064. The total duration is almost one millennium, exactly 992 years.

Related eclipses

Solar eclipses 2051–2054

Saros 155 series

Metonic series

References

External links 
 NASA graphics

2054 9 2
2054 in science
2054 9 2
2054 9 2